Johan Ernst Mowinckel (7 November 1860 – 23 March 1947) was a Norwegian merchant and politician from Bergen. He was the great grandson of Johan Ernst Mowinckel (1759–1816), and the brother of actress Agnes Mowinckel.

He established his own company in 1882. He also founded a butter factory, which later became Mowinckels Margarinfabrik. He took part in politics in Bergen, and was a member of the Storting from 1922 to 1924, representing the Conservative Party.

References

1860 births
Businesspeople from Bergen
Politicians from Bergen
Members of the Storting
1947 deaths
19th-century Norwegian businesspeople